Przekop Wisły (German: Weichseldurchstich) is a branch of the Vistula river in its delta. Its name is often shortened to just Przekop.

History 
Work on the Przekop began in June 1891. 1,000 workers and 40 steam machines were dedicated to the project.  of dirt was displaced from the construction site. 20 million marks were spent on the project in total. An opening ceremony was not held once the canal was finished—at 3:45p.m. on 31 March 1895, president of East Prussia Gustav von Goßler was sent a telegraph signal by Wilhelm II, German Emperor, to open the canal. He followed the Emperor's orders and opened it by himself.

Measurements 
In June 2022, the water levels of the Przekop reached .

Geology 
The deposition of the sediments on the canal's surface is progressing at a fast pace and its surface is mostly made up of coarse sands with leptokurtic distribution.

References 

Canals in Poland
Transport in Poland
Nowy Dwór Gdański County
Gdańsk
Geography of Pomeranian Voivodeship
Canals opened in 1895